Should not be confused with East Rock, another traprock summit in Connecticut


East Peak, is a prominent basalt traprock mountain in the Hanging Hills of Meriden, Connecticut. A small stone observation tower known as Castle Craig stands on the summit. 

East Peak is located within the  Hubbard Park. The  Metacomet Trail crosses East Peak, and a seasonal auto road climbs to a small parking lot at Castle Craig. Activities enjoyed on the peak include Hiking, bicycling, and in the winter, cross-country skiing on the road. Rock climbing is only permitted for Ragged Mountain Foundation members who have obtained a permit from Meriden's parks and recreation department.

See also
 Metacomet Ridge

References

External links
 
 Connecticut Walk Book  17th ed. Connecticut Forest and Park Association.
 The City of Meriden

Hanging Hills
Meriden, Connecticut
Tourist attractions in New Haven County, Connecticut
Mountains of Connecticut
Landforms of New Haven County, Connecticut